The 2022–23 South Florida Bulls women's basketball team represented the University of South Florida in the 2022–23 NCAA Division I women's basketball season. The Bulls, coached by Jose Fernandez in his 23rd season, played their home games at Yuengling Center in Tampa, Florida. This is USF's tenth season as a member of the American Athletic Conference, known as The American or AAC.

Previous season 
The Bulls finished the 2021–22 season 24–9, 12–3 in AAC play to finish in second place. They advanced to the championship game of the American Athletic Conference women's tournament where they lost to UCF. They received at-large bid to the NCAA women's tournament where they lost to Miami in the first round.

Offseason

Departures
Due to COVID-19 disruptions throughout NCAA sports in 2020–21, the NCAA announced that the 2020–21 season would not count against the athletic eligibility of any individual involved in an NCAA winter sport, including women's basketball. This meant that all seniors in 2020–21 had the option to return for 2021–22.

Incoming transfers

Recruiting
There were no recruiting classing class of 2022.

Media
All Bulls games aired on Bullscast Radio or CBS 1010 AM. All home games and home and away conference games were available on one of the ESPN networks or their streaming service ESPN+.

Roster

Schedule

|-
!colspan=9 style=| Non-conference regular season

|-
!colspan=9 style=| AAC regular season

|-
!colspan=9 style=|AAC Women's Tournament

|-
!colspan=9 style=|NCAA Women's Tournament

Rankings

*The preseason and week 1 polls were the same.^Coaches did not release a week 2 poll.

See also
2022–23 South Florida Bulls men's basketball team

References

South Florida Bulls women's basketball seasons
South Florida
South Florida Bulls women's basketball
South Florida Bulls women's basketball
South Florida